The Netherlands is a European Parliament constituency for elections in the European Union covering the member state of Netherlands. It is currently represented by twenty-nine Members of the European Parliament. Until the 2009 European Parliament election, it excluded the Dutch in the Netherlands Antilles and Aruba.

Background information

Current Members of the European Parliament

Elections

1979

The 1979 European election was the first direct election to the European Parliament to be held and hence the first time the Netherlands had voted. Four parties won seats: the conservative liberal People's Party for Freedom and Democracy (VVD), the progressive liberal Democrats 66 (D66), the Christian-democratic Christian Democratic Appeal (CDA) and the social-democratic Labour Party. Five other nationally represented parties competed but won no seats. 58.1% of the Dutch population turned out on election day.

1984

The 1984 European election was the second election to the European Parliament and the second for the Netherlands. In these elections two alliances formed successful common lists:
 left-wing parties Communist Party of the Netherlands (CPN), Pacifist Socialist Party (PSP) and Political Party of Radicals (PPR) parties (Green Progressive Accord) (won 2 seats)
 the orthodox Protestant Political Reformed Party (SGP), Reformed Political Alliance (GPV), Reformatory Political Federation (RPF) (won 1 seat)

The progressive liberal Democrats 66 (D66) lost its two seats and disappeared from the parliament. 50.9% of the Dutch population turned out.

1989

The 1989 European election was the third election to the European Parliament and the third for the Netherlands. The conservative liberal People's Party for Freedom and Democracy (VVD) lost seats to the progressive liberal Democrats 66 (D66), which returned to the European parliament after a five-year absence. 47.5% of the electorate turned out.

1994

The 1994 European election was the fourth election to the European Parliament and the fourth for the Netherlands. The liberal People's Party for Freedom and Democracy (VVD) and Democrats 66 (D66) parties and the orthodox Protestant alliance of Political Reformed Party, Reformatory Political Federation and Reformed Political Alliance profited from the increase in the number of seats. While the Christian Democratic Appeal and the Labour Party lost a considerable number of votes, but remained stable in terms of seats. 35.7% of Dutch voters turned out on election day.

1999

The 1999 European election was the fifth election to the European Parliament and the fifth for the Netherlands. With only 30 percent of the population showing up, the voter turnout hit an all-time low for Dutch elections on the national level. In the election, GreenLeft performed particularly well quadrupling their seats from one to four, the Socialist Party also won its first seat. These gains were made at the cost of the Christian Democratic Appeal, Democrats 66 and the Labour Party, which lost one, two and two seats respectively.

2004

The 2004 European election was the sixth election to the European Parliament and the sixth for the Netherlands. The election was held on 10 June 2004. The ruling centre-right parties, the Christian Democratic Appeal and the People's Party for Freedom and Democracy polled poorly, while the opposition Labour Party and Socialist Party gained ground. The anti-fraud party Europe Transparent of whistle blower Paul van Buitenen unexpectedly won two seats.

2009

The 2009 European election was the seventh election to the European Parliament and the seventh for the Netherlands.

2014

The 2014 European election was the eighth election to the European Parliament and the eighth for the Netherlands. The Christian Democratic Appeal won the most seats and was seen as the winner of the 2014 elections, but was overtaken by Democrats 66 in terms of numbers of votes. The Christian Democratic Appeal won an extra seat thanks to their electoral alliance with Christian Union – Reformed Political Party (Christian Union-SGP). The eurosceptic Party for Freedom (PVV) was the biggest loser, although it only lost 1 seat.
In contrast to other European countries, the eurosceptic movement did worse than in previous elections.

2019

The 2019 European election was the ninth election to the European Parliament and the ninth for the Netherlands.

References 

European Parliament elections in the Netherlands
European Parliament constituencies
1979 establishments in the Netherlands
Constituencies established in 1979